John M. Pollard (born 1941) is a British mathematician who has invented algorithms for the factorization of large numbers and for the calculation of discrete logarithms.

His factorization algorithms include the rho, p − 1,  and the first version of the special number field sieve, which has since been improved by others.

His discrete logarithm algorithms include the rho algorithm for logarithms and the kangaroo algorithm. He received the RSA Award for Excellence in Mathematics.

External links
 John Pollard's web site

Living people
20th-century British mathematicians
21st-century British mathematicians
Number theorists
Place of birth missing (living people)
1941 births